Kettlotrechus is a genus of beetles in the family Carabidae, containing the following species:

 Kettlotrechus edridgeae Townsend, 2010
 Kettlotrechus marchanti Townsend, 2010
 Kettlotrechus millari Townsend, 2010
 Kettlotrechus orpheus (Britton, 1962)
 Kettlotrechus pluto (Britton, 1964)

References

Trechinae